The Hugpong sa Tawong Lungsod ("People's Party" in Cebuano), commonly referred to as Hugpong, is a local Davao City-based political organization, founded by Rodrigo Duterte, a mayor in Davao City. The political party is considered as a precursor of the newly-established Hugpong ng Pagbabago. It was registered as a local political party on March 28, 2011 at the Commission on Elections (COMELEC).

Notable members

Elected Philippine President
Rodrigo Duterte  (16th President of the Philippines; longest-serving Mayor of Davao City; party founder)

Others
Sara Duterte-Carpio  (Mayor of Davao City) 
Paolo Duterte  (Former Vice Mayor of Davao City, Congressman for the 1st District) 
Luzviminda Ilagan  (Former Gabriela Women's Party representative in the 14th Congress of the Philippines and candidate for Davao City councilor, third district)

References 

Local political parties in the Philippines
Rodrigo Duterte
Political parties established in 2011
Politics of Davao City
2011 establishments in the Philippines